Hematopoietic ulcers are those occurring with sickle cell anemia, congenital hemolytic anemia, polycythemia vera, thrombocytopenic purpura, macroglobulinemia, and cryoglobulinemia.

See also 
 Skin lesion

References 

Vascular-related cutaneous conditions